Dhital is a village development committee in Kaski District in the Gandaki Zone of northern-central Nepal. At the time of the 1991 Nepal census it had a population of 4,121 persons living in 862 individual households. Dhital is near Annapurna Himalaya and it is on the route of trekking.

References

External links 
 UN map of the municipalities of Kaski District

Populated places in Kaski District